Letter from Naples (Italian: Lettera napoletana) is a 1954 Italian musical melodrama film directed by Giorgio Pastina and starring Giacomo Rondinella, Virna Lisi and Otello Toso.

The film's sets were designed by the art director Alfredo Montori. It was shot on location in Naples.

Plot 
In Naples, Don Gaetano's company has Alvaro Ramirez as a partner, who is secretly in love with his secretary Laura. Among the various employees is Franco, in love, also secretly, with the boss's daughter, Anna. Only Carluccio, a nice worker, knows of the affair between Franco and Don Gaetano's daughter. At a party the two boys kiss, but Alvaro suspects something and tells his lover that the marriage between the two does not want it at all, because this would mean that Franco, a former delivery boy, would become the master.

To make money, he convinces his lover to take some money to give for a shady turnover, but the motorcycle with the money is captured off the coast of Salerno. The secretary is desperate, but Alvaro has another idea and puts a bomb on the safe, after taking more money and checks, simulating a robbery. Her daughter, Anna, pretends to be ill, sending Concetta to a party. So she goes out with Franco, but Alvaro sees them together. Carluccio notices the theft from the safe and the police are called.

Among the suspects there is also Franco, who defends himself by saying that at the time of the outbreak he was at the cinema, but no one saw him. He actually was with Anna, but he can't tell. Alvaro tries to frame him, sending him with Carluccio to pick up a load carrying coffee, but in truth he also has contraband cigarettes inside. Finance discovers them and arrests them. Meanwhile Laura goes to the home of Franco's mother, who, being blind, does not see her putting the stolen money between the pages of one of her books. Don Gaetano returns and his daughter, in tears, tells him everything; but her father doesn't take it well and threatens to kill Franco. Gaetano still wants to get them out of prison, but the police keep them inside because the money and checks placed by Laura at Franco's house are found. Anna goes to Franco's mother and tells her everything; she then she goes to Franco and she tells him she is pregnant. Alvaro has another idea and decides to go and have a talk with Anna and, to save her honor from her father, he proposes to marry him.

At a celebration where the inmates are also present, Franco sings the song "Lettera Napoletana" on the radio, moving his mother and Anna who listen to him from their homes. Anna has to get married but she convinces her father that she can't do it and he agrees. Laura, in a moment of weakness and sincerity, tells Gaetano everything, who awaits Alvaro's return. After a fight, in which the youngest and strongest Alvaro wins, Gaetano gets up and hits him from the back with a hammer on the head.

He decides to call the police, but Alvaro recovers and shoots him wounding him; then he runs away. But Gaetano manages to reveal to the police that the criminal will surely go away with the ship that is about to leave for the port. So the police search the ship, but when they find Alvaro, the latter reacts and is killed. Now Franco and Anna can kiss peacefully on the beach.

Cast
 Giacomo Rondinella as Franco De Rosa 
 Virna Lisi as Anna Esposito 
 Otello Toso as Álvaro Ramírez 
 Beniamino Maggio as Carluccio 
 Rosalia Maggio as Concetta 
 Lia Orlandini as Franco De Rosa's Mother 
 Natale Cirino as Commendator Gaetano Esposito 
 Ignazio Balsamo as The Police Commissioner 
 Giulio Battiferri as Juan 
 Pasquale De Filippo as Caporale 
 Luigi Pisano as The Prison Warden 
 Almarella as The Nightclub Singer 
 Lianella Carell as Laura Conforto 
 Pasquale Martino as Prison Officer 
 Mario Passante as The Restaurant Waiter

References

Bibliography 
 Chiti, Roberto & Poppi, Roberto. Dizionario del cinema italiano: Dal 1945 al 1959. Gremese Editore, 1991.

External links 
 

1954 films
Italian musical films
1954 musical films
1950s Italian-language films
Films directed by Giorgio Pastina
Films set in Naples
Films shot in Naples
Italian black-and-white films
1950s Italian films